Guaçuí is a municipality located in the Brazilian state of Espírito Santo. Its population was 31,122 (2020) and its area is 469 km².

References

Municipalities in Espírito Santo